Alfred Carter may refer to:

Alfred Carter (cricketer) (1869–1920), Australian cricketer and Australian Rules footballer
Alfred Carter (footballer) (1877–1960), English footballer
Howard Carter (Pentecostal pioneer) (Alfred Howard Carter, 1891–1971), American Pentecostal
Alfred Wellington Carter (1867–1949), former Parker Ranch manager
Alfred Williams Carter (1894–1986), Canadian World War I ace pilot

See also
Al Carter (disambiguation)